The 2012 Los Angeles Galaxy season was the club's 18th year of existence as well as their 17th season in Major League Soccer (MLS) and their 17th consecutive year in the top-flight of American soccer. The Galaxy entered the season as both the defending MLS Cup and Supporters' Shield winners.

The 2012 campaign was highlighted by the Galaxy successfully defending their MLS Cup title, defeating Houston Dynamo, 3–1, in the MLS Cup final to win their fourth ever MLS Cup championship, tying D.C. United for the most league championships in MLS history, and the second most in North American history.

Although Los Angeles defended their MLS Cup trophy, the club failed to defend the Supporters' Shield, losing on point differential to their upstate rivals, the San Jose Earthquakes on point total. Most of this is to blame due to poorer performance early on in the season, before a second-half season resurgence.

Elsewhere, the Galaxy also competed in 2012 Desert Diamond Cup, winning the preseason tournament, the 2011–12 and 2012–13 CONCACAF Champions League, as well as the 2012 U.S. Open Cup. In the 2011–12 edition of the Champions League, the Galaxy reached the quarterfinals before losing 4–3 on aggregate to Canadian side, Toronto FC. In the 2012–13 edition, the Galaxy won their group for the second straight year, and reached the knockout round, which will be played during the 2013 campaign. Finally, the Galaxy were eliminated in the third round proper of the Open Cup losing to second-tier North American Soccer League outfit, Carolina RailHawks.

In noncompetitive tournaments, the Galaxy hosted Spanish club, Real Madrid, in the 2012 World Football Challenge, losing the exhibition match, 1–5.

Background 

The Galaxy entered the 2012 season off of one of the franchise's most successful campaigns ever. The club earned the league double, winning both the Supporters' Shield and the MLS Cup. Additionally, the Galaxy reached the quarterfinals of the U.S. Open Cup,  and were the only American team to win their group in the CONCACAF Champions League, posting a record of four wins, two losses and no draws.

Following the 2011 MLS Cup Playoffs, the Galaxy embarked on a two-week, postseason tour across Asia, stopping in Australia, the Philippines and Indonesia. During the tour, the Galaxy finished undefeated, winning twice and tying once.

Offseason reports involved David Beckham's contract concluding at the end of 2011, and whether or not he would remain with the Galaxy. On January 18, 2012, Galaxy announced Beckham had signed a new two-year contract to remain in Los Angeles.

Competitions

Pre-season

Desert Diamond Cup

Standings

Matches

CONCACAF Champions League (2011–12)

Major League Soccer

Standings 
Western Conference Table

Overall table

Results summary

Results by round

Matches

MLS Cup Playoffs

Knockout round

Conference semifinals

Conference finals

Championship

U.S. Open Cup

International Friendlies

World Football Challenge

CONCACAF Champions League (2012–13) 

The Galaxy earned a berth into Group Stage of the CONCACAF Champions League by winning the Supporters Shield on October 8, 2011. Since the Galaxy also won the MLS Cup, which also merits a direct bye into group play, the Galaxy forfeited their Shield berth to the Sounders and took the MLS Cup berth.

Player movement and trades

Transfers

In

MLS Drafts

Out

Loan in

Loan out

Kits

Miscellany

Allocation ranking 
Los Angeles is in the #19 position in the MLS Allocation Ranking. The allocation ranking is the mechanism used to determine which MLS club has first priority to acquire a U.S. National Team player who signs with MLS after playing abroad, or a former MLS player who returns to the league after having gone to a club abroad for a transfer fee. A ranking can be traded, provided that part of the compensation received in return is another club's ranking.

International roster slots 
Los Angeles has 7 MLS International Roster Slots for use in the 2012 season. Each club in Major League Soccer is allocated 8 international roster spots. Los Angeles traded one slot to Portland Timbers, traded another to Philadelphia Union, and acquired one from D.C. United. Each of these trades expire on January 1, 2013.

Future draft pick trades 
Future picks acquired:
2013 MLS SuperDraft Round 2 pick from Philadelphia Union
2014 MLS Supplemental Draft Round 2 pick from New York Red Bulls
Future picks traded:
2014 MLS SuperDraft Round 4 pick to Houston Dynamo

Awards and honors

References 

LA Galaxy seasons
Los Angeles Galaxy
Los Angeles Galaxy
Los Angeles Galaxy
MLS Cup champion seasons